Maldives Post Limited is the national post office of the Maldive Islands.

The company offers a range of postal services including the Express Mail Service and a Money Order service.

References

External links
Official website

Communications in the Maldives
Philately of the Maldives